The Waldo Mountain fire lookout is located atop Waldo Mountain, in the Willamette National Forest, Oregon.

The original fire lookout tower was built on this site in 1926 and was a small cabin. In 1929 a cupola style lookout replaced the cabin. The current flat top lookout was built in 1956. The lookout is currently unstaffed and no longer a functioning lookout.

This is hike #90 in William Sullivan's 100 Hikes in the Central Oregon Cascades. Sullivan describes the hike as a difficult  loop with a 2,000' elevation gain.

References

Government buildings completed in 1929
Towers completed in 1929
Government buildings completed in 1956
Towers completed in 1956
Buildings and structures in Lane County, Oregon
Cascade Range
Fire lookout towers in Oregon
1926 establishments in Oregon